D'erlanger is the self-titled fifth album by Japanese rock band D'erlanger, released on November 11, 2009. It reached number 19 on the Oricon chart. The limited edition came with a DVD of the music video for "Angelic Poetry" and other material. "Easy Make, Easy Mark" was a speed metal song the band wrote and played back in the 1980s. For 2017's D'erlanger Tribute Album ~Stairway to Heaven~, "Easy Make, Easy Mark" was covered by Dir en Grey.

Track listing
 "11Loss"
 
 "Masquerade"
 "Angelic Poetry"
 
 "Your Funeral My Trial"
 "Singe et Insecte"
 "Rose of Thanatos"
 "Love/Hate"
 "Easy Make, Easy Mark"
 "Love Me to Death"
 "Love Me to Death (In the Air)"

References

2009 albums
D'erlanger albums